Juan R. Escudero  is one of the 81 municipalities of Guerrero, in south-western Mexico. The municipal seat lies at Tierra Colorada. The municipality covers an area of 652.6 km².

As of 2005, the municipality had a total population of 22,805.

Geography

Towns and villages 
In 2005, the INEGI registered 33 localities in Juan R. Escudero. The largest are as follows:

Administration

Municipal presidents

References

Municipalities of Guerrero